Luigi Pasquarelli ( born 2/11/ 1832 in Marsico Nuovo, Basilicata -died 1889 in Napoli,Campania) was an Italian sculptor.
Was bos from Antonio  and Antonia Lauria.
Pasquarelli completed his studies in Naples. He gained acclaim in 1877 in Naples for a marble group depicting: Un episodio di Pompei. Among his other works are: Pescatore amalfitano; Piccola ciociara; Fruttivendola; Busto muliebre; some portraits, many bassorilievi and funereal monuments. At Turin, in 1880, he exhibited a statue depicting: Un venditore napoletano di frutta. Minutes of a meeting of the council of Naples from 1872, document a trip to Brazil.

Federica De Rosa, Prime ricerche su Luigi Pasquarelli, scultore lucano fra Napoli, Firenze e Rio de Janeiro sta nella rivista Napoli Nobilissima, vol.I, fasc.II e III, maggio-dicembre 2015

Antonio Lotierzo: Luigi Pasquarelli sta in Talenti Lucani- Cultura, 17/01/2023

References

19th-century Italian sculptors
Italian male sculptors
1889 deaths
Year of birth missing
19th-century Italian male artists